Kundal Shahi is a village and tourist resort in the Neelam Valley in northern Azad Kashmir, Pakistan. It has a scattered settlement area, located on both sides of the Jagran Nallah River, at its confluence with the Neelam River.

The majority of the population are of the Qureshi ethnic group, and there are small numbers of people from the Sheikh, Mughal, and Sayyid groups. Members of the Qureshi community, numbering about 3,000 people, speak the Kundal Shahi language. It is an endangered language as it is not being learned by the younger generation, who are shifting to Hindko, the language of wider communication in the area. Most of the people of the village follow the Barelvi school of Sunni Islam.

See also
Athmuqam
Dosut
Kutton
Keran
Sharda
Kel

References

Notes

Citations

Bibliography 

Populated places in Neelam District
2005 Kashmir earthquake
Tourist attractions in Azad Kashmir